Mazzoni is an Italian surname.  The earliest members of the Mazzoni listed here hailed from either Emilia-Romagna or its western neighbor Tuscany in the 15th century.  Other (and less notable) members have been consistently recorded in the Serchio River Valley of Tuscany — especially in the vicinity of Barga — since the 16th century.

Surname
  Mr. Mazzoni (first name unrevealed), Italian race car driver, co-driver in the 1973 Sanremo Rally for Opel Ascona
 Alfredo Mazzoni, Italian professional football player and coach
 Angelo Mazzoni, Italian Olympic fencer (see Fencing at the 1984 Summer Olympics, Fencing at the 1996 Summer Olympics and List of 2000 Summer Olympics medal winners)
 Angiolo Mazzoni, Italian architect
 Antonio Maria Mazzoni, Italian composer (see 1785 in music)
 Carlo Mazzoni, Italian actor (see L' Amore di Norma)
 Cesare Mazzoni, Italian painter, student of Giovanni Gioseffo dal Sole
 Corrado Mazzoni (1892–1917), Italian World War I lieutenant 
 Cory Mazzoni, American professional baseball pitcher
 Cristina Mazzoni, American language professor/literary critic, a one-time joint chronicler of Gemma Galgani
 Dave Mazzoni, American film director, producer, and screenwriter
 Emiliano Mazzoni, Italian astronomer, joint discoverer of 69977 Saurodonati and Asteroid 91257
 Erminia Mazzoni, Italian politician, member of the Union of Christian and Centre Democrats
 Franca Mazzoni, Italian actress (see L' Amore di Norma)
 Gianni Mazzoni, Italian sports doctor, former assistant of Francesco Conconi, former affiliate of 
 Giuliana Mazzoni, Italian psychology researcher/professor (see Dream argument)
 Giuliano Mazzoni, Italian rally driver
 Giulio Mazzoni, Italian painter/stuccoist
 Giuseppe Mazzoni, Italian politician (Italian article here; his statue stands adjacent to the Prato Cathedral)
 Guido Mazzoni, Italian sculptor
 Guido Mazzoni, Italian poet/professor
 Guy Mazzoni, French chess player, two-time winner of the French Chess Championship and one-time winner of the Paris City Chess Championship, one-time competitor in the Monte Carlo chess tournament
 Isabella Discalzi Mazzoni, Italian sculptor, active late 15th century
 Jacopo Mazzoni, Italian philosopher
 Javier Mazzoni, Argentine football (soccer) player (see Polideportivo Ejido#Famous players)
 Kerry Mazzoni, American politician
 Luca Mazzoni, Italian football (soccer) player
 Marc Mazzoni, American musician, former member of Ten Mile Tide
 Marco Mazzoni, Italian artist
 Margherita Pavesi Mazzoni, Italian painter, sculptor and poet.
 Massimo Mazzoni, Italian songwriter, author of at least one song that was featured in the Zecchino d'Oro
 Peter Mazzoni M.D., American physician
 Msgr. Pier Luigi Mazzoni, Archbishop of Gaeta
 Pietro Mazzoni, Italian politician, mayor of Montedinove
 Roberto Mazzoni, Italian former sports shooter
 Sebastiano Mazzoni, Italian painter
 Torquato Mazzoni (1824–after 1869), Italian painter
 Vittorio Mazzoni, Italian physiologist, discoverer of Mazzoni's corpuscles and joint discoverer of Golgi-Mazzoni bodies
 Vittorio Mazzoni della Stella (born 1941), Italian politician

Fictional people
 Apothecary Mazzoni, a character in The Flame and the Arrow

Italian-language surnames
Lists of people by surname